Gençlik Stadium is a football stadium in the Reşatbey neighborhood of the city of Adana. The stadium is opened in 1938, together with the 5 Ocak Stadium and the Menderes Sports Hall, as a sports complex. The stadium has a capacity of 2000 spectators with an only East Stand. Player change rooms are under the East Stand of 5 Ocak Stadium at the west side of the Gençlik Stadium.

The stadium is currently used for football matches only, and it is the home ground of Adana İdmanyurdu women's and the Seyhan Belediyespor men's football teams.

References

Football venues in Turkey
Sport venues in Adana
Buildings and structures in Adana
Sports venues completed in 1973
1973 establishments in Turkey